Pierre Creamer (born July 6, 1944) is a Canadian former ice hockey coach. He was head coach of the Pittsburgh Penguins during the 1987–88 NHL season.

Creamer was born in Chomedey, Quebec.  He is the brother-in-law of former NHL star Mike Bossy.

Creamer previously coached the Sherbrooke Canadiens, the American Hockey League affiliate of the Montreal Canadiens. He led the team to a Calder Cup championship in his first year behind the bench and ended his three-year tenure with a 120-104-4 record. Creamer had also held a job as coach of the Verdun Juniors of the QMJHL.

Despite coaching a Mario Lemieux-led team that finished fourth in goals scored, Creamer's 1987-88 Penguins struggled defensively and finished last in the Patrick Division. He was relieved of his position at season's end; Creamer is currently the only "one year wonder" coach in NHL history to have a winning record.

Coaching record

References

External links

1944 births
Canadian ice hockey coaches
Ice hockey people from Quebec
Living people
Laval Titan coaches
Montreal Juniors coaches
Pittsburgh Penguins coaches
Verdun Juniors coaches